The Gyrowheel Monument in Schönau an der Brend, Bavaria, Germany, is a monument to the invention of the gym wheel by Otto Feick in 1926. It consists of an artificial stone hill with a gyrowheel on the top. Under the gyrowheel is a small fountain.

Monuments and memorials in Germany
Buildings and structures in Rhön-Grabfeld